Mahmoud Amr El-Wany (born March 8, 1981) is an Egyptian former swimmer, who specialized in middle-distance freestyle events. He is a single-time Olympian (2000), and a member of Al-Ahly Swim Club in Cairo.

El-Wany competed only in the men's 200 m freestyle at the 2000 Summer Olympics in Sydney. He eclipsed a FINA B-cut of 1:55.28 (200 m freestyle) from the Egyptian Championships in Cairo. He challenged four other swimmers in heat one, including Uzbekistan's two-time Olympian Oleg Tsvetkovskiy. Leading the other half of the race, El-Wany faded shortly to a second seed on the final lap by 0.26 seconds behind Tsvetkovskiy, but bettered a personal mark of 1:55.19. El-Wany failed to advance into the semifinals, as he placed forty-sixth overall in the prelims.

References

1981 births
Living people
Egyptian male freestyle swimmers
Olympic swimmers of Egypt
Swimmers at the 2000 Summer Olympics
Sportspeople from Cairo
20th-century Egyptian people
21st-century Egyptian people